Bluesnik is an album by American saxophonist Jackie McLean recorded in 1961 and released on the Blue Note label. It features McLean in a quintet with trumpeter Freddie Hubbard, pianist Kenny Drew, bassist Doug Watkins and drummer Pete La Roca.

Reception
The Allmusic review by Thom Jurek awarded the album 4½ stars and stated: "Many critics-as well as jazz fans hold to the opinion that Bluesnik may be McLean's most accessible session for the label... this is a monster session effortlessly performed by a soloist at an early peak and a supporting cast of blazing sidemen." The Penguin Guide to Jazz rates the album three and a half out of four stars and describes it as "Tough, unreconstructed modern blues that reveal considerable depths on subsequent hearings" and further states that the album is "An excellent record, that should be a high priority for anyone interested in McLean's music."

Track listing

All compositions by Jackie McLean except as indicated

 "Bluesnik" - 9:36
 "Goin' 'Way Blues" - 6:34
 "Drew's Blues" (Kenny Drew) - 5:52
 "Cool Green" (Drew) - 5:20
 "Blues Function" (Freddie Hubbard) - 7:19
 "Torchin'" (Drew) - 6:11
 "Goin' 'Way Blues" [alternate take] - 6:42 Bonus track on CD reissue
 "Torchin'" (Drew) [alternate take] - 6:16 Bonus track on CD reissue

Personnel
Jackie McLean - alto saxophone
Freddie Hubbard - trumpet
Kenny Drew - piano
Doug Watkins - bass
Pete La Roca - drums

References

Blue Note Records albums
Jackie McLean albums
1962 albums
Albums produced by Alfred Lion
Albums recorded at Van Gelder Studio